The Huichahue River is a river of Chile.

See also
List of rivers of Chile

References
 Evaluacion de los recuros hidricos superficiales en la cuenca del rio bio

Rivers of Chile
Rivers of Araucanía Region